Phytoecia povolnyi is a species of beetle in the family Cerambycidae. It was described by Leopold Heyrovský in 1971. It is known from Afghanistan.

References

Phytoecia
Beetles described in 1971